The lineage of Alma the Younger is a set of minor figures from the Book of Mormon who descended from Alma the Younger. They are described as Nephite record-keepers, missionaries and prophets.

Family tree

Ammaron

Ammaron should not be confused with Amaron, Ammoron, or Amoron, three other Book of Mormon figures with similar names.

According to the Book of Mormon, Ammaron (Ammoron a frequent scribal variant in the Printer's Manuscript) was a Nephite record-keeper and perhaps a prophet.  He was also one of the authors who wrote on the Plates of Nephi, which Mormon abridged.

Ammaron took custody of the Nephite records after the death of his brother, Amos, in AD 306 and three verses contain Mormon's abridgment of his writings. In 321, he hid all the Nephites' sacred writings in the Hill Shim in the Land of Antum. He later instructed the ten-year-old future prophet Mormon to wait until he was 24 and then take the Plates of Nephi from the hill (leaving the other writings hidden) and continue the record.

Amos, son of Amos
According to the Book of Mormon, Amos was a Nephite record keeper.  His father was Amos, and his grandfather was Nephi III, Son of Nephi the Disciple.  Mormon is thought to have abridged his record which consists of 26 verses in the Book of 4th Nephi.  Amos must have been exceptionally long-lived, for he had custody of the Nephite records for 112 years, approximately from AD  194 to 306 (although a certain commentator suggests that this Amos may be referring to at least two different people).  are an abridgment of his writings. When Amos died, his brother Ammaron took over as record keeper.

Amos' record relates the degeneration of the society of the Nephites after the appearance of Jesus on the American continent.  This degeneration is due to the pride of the people.

Amos, son of Nephi
According to the Book of Mormon, Amos was a Nephite record keeper and son of Nephi the Disciple.  Amos had custody of the Nephite records for 84 years, from approximately AD 110 to 194.  Upon his death the Book of Mormon record passed to his son Amos.

Two verses, are an abridgment (by Mormon) of his writings:

19 And it came to pass that Nephi, he that kept this last record, (and he kept it upon the plates of Nephi) died, and his son Amos kept it in his stead; and he kept it upon the plates of Nephi also.
20 And he kept it eighty and four years, and there was still peace in the land, save it were a small part of the people who had revolted from the church and taken upon them the name of Lamanites; therefore there began to be Lamanites again in the land.

Corianton
According to the Book of Mormon, Corianton was a Nephite missionary, the third son of Alma the Younger (the first chief judge). Circa 74 BC (17th year of the reign of the judges), Corianton went with his older brother Shiblon and his father Alma, and five others (Amulek, Zeezrom, Ammon, Aaron, and Omner), on a proselytizing mission to the Zoramites in Antionum, while his eldest brother Helaman stayed behind. The group witnessed the peculiar worship of the Zoramites, including their prayers upon the Rameumptom.

His father Alma reprimanded him for his grievous sins, commanded him to repent, and preached to him about the afterlife, the Resurrection, and the Atonement of Jesus Christ. Shortly thereafter, Alma called him again to preach to the people. The last account in the Book of Mormon of Corianton is that he journeyed to a northern land to deliver provisions.

Helaman, son of Helaman

According to the Book of Mormon, Helaman, son of Helaman, (sometimes referred to as Helaman II) was a Nephite prophet who lived around 30 BC. His father was Helaman, son of Alma, who was also a prophet and military commander. The younger of Helaman's sons include the missionaries Nephi and Lehi. He served as chief judge for seven years and then gave the Judgement Seat to his son Nephi. He then died in 39 BC.

Shiblon
According to the Book of Mormon, Shiblon was a Nephite missionary and record-keeper. He was the second son of Alma the Younger, who was the first chief judge. Circa 74 BC (17th year of the reign of the judges), Shiblon went with his father, younger brother Corianton, and five others (Amulek, Zeezrom, Ammon, Aaron, and Omner), on a mission to proselytize to the Zoramites in Antionum, while his older brother Helaman stayed behind. The group witnessed the peculiar worship of the Zoramites in their congregations, including their prayers on the Rameumptom.

Zoramite mission
At the beginning of the Zoramite mission, Alma prayed for Shiblon and the group for the Lord to sustain and guide them. As Alma blessed them by the laying on of his hands on their heads afterwards, each was filled with the Holy Spirit, and each went separate ways to begin their missions. Through faith and prayer, they succeeded among the poorer classes, who had been shunned from other churches because of their lowly appearance.

Alma's counsel
In 73 BC, during Shiblon's mission to the Zoramites, Alma gave him counsel and advice. From these instructions, we learn that Shiblon was held in bonds and stoned for the Word's sake. According to Alma, Shiblon bore all things with patience because the Lord was with him.  We also discover the following strengths and weaknesses that Shiblon may have possessed through the words of counsel Alma gives:

Strengths
Steady and faithful to God since youth
Diligent, patient, and long-suffering

Possible weaknesses
Remember to trust God
Continue to preach; do not be idle
Be diligent and temperate; do not be over-passionate
Do not be proud or boastful; be humble and sober
Be bold, but do not domineer

Importance of continual encouragement
Shiblon appears to obey his father's teachings; Alma advises that adult children need continual direction and encouragement from their fathers regardless of the child's maturity and station.

Record-keeping in later years
Circa 56 BC (36th year of the judges), Shiblon inherited the records and other items from his brother Helaman. He kept them for three years, then realized he would soon die.  Because he could not deliver them to Corianton who had gone north in a ship, he gave them to his nephew Helaman II.  As he predicted, he died shortly afterwards, c. 53 BC.

Name origin and other uses
Latter-day Saint scholar Hugh Nibley stated both names are probably related to the Arabic word shibl, "lion cub," and argued that Shiblon may have been a variant of Shiblom. His student Benjamin Urrutia further connected it with "Jaguar Cub" imagery of the Olmec people.

Shiblon is also a Nephite word for a weight of silver, equal to half a senine of gold, or a senum of silver. See Book of Mormon weights and measures.

Timothy, son of Nephi
According to the Book of Mormon, Timothy was the son of Nephi, son of Helaman, and brother of Nephi the Disciple.  At one point while preaching as a missionary, he was stoned to death but was raised from the dead by his brother.  After the appearance of the resurrected Jesus Christ to the Nephites, he along with Nephi was chosen by Christ to be one of Twelve Disciples.

Timothy is relatively unusual in the Book of Mormon for having a Greek name.  (See also Mulekites.)

See also 

Alma the Younger
Book of Alma
Book of Mormon

References

External links
 Corianton - the "Corianton" entry in the Guide to the Scriptures at churchofjesuschrist.org.

Book of Mormon people